McKenzie Bridge State Airport  is a public airport located 3 miles (4.8 km) east of McKenzie Bridge, in Lane County, Oregon, United States.

External links

Airports in Lane County, Oregon